KVOM may refer to:

 KVOM (AM), a radio station (800 AM) licensed to Morrilton, Arkansas, United States
 KVOM-FM, a radio station (101.7 FM) licensed to Morrilton, Arkansas, United States